Kristina Edmundovna Orbakaitе (born 25 May 1971),  is a Russian-Lithuanian singer and actress. Her parents are Russian pop star Alla Pugacheva and Lithuanian circus performer Mykolas Orbakas.

Biography
Kristina Orbakaite was born in Moscow and spent much of her childhood between Šventoji, Lithuania, the home of her paternal grandparents, and Moscow, the home of her maternal grandparents. 

At the age of 7, she debuted in the Soviet children's television program "Veseliye Notki" (Happy Musical Notes) with the song "Solnyshko Smeyotsya" (The Sun Laughs). In 1982, she was cast in the leading role of "Lena Bessoltseva" in Scarecrow, a film by Rolan Bykov based on the Vladimir Zheleznikov play of the same name. Production began in 1982 and the film premiered in 1984. It became a critical success, not only in Russia but also overseas, and turned Orbakaite into a child star.

Having met with success in film and music, Orbakaite tried her hand at theater, appearing in 1995 as Helen Keller in an adaptation of William Gibson's The Miracle Worker on the stage of the Moscow Art Theatre. She subsequently received an award from the Russian Ministry of Culture for best female theatrical performance.

In 1996, Orbakaite and her partner, singer Vladimir Presnyakov, joined her mother, Alla Pugacheva, and her mother's then husband, singer Philipp Kirkorov, on a family performance tour through the United States titled "Zvezdnoye Leto" (Starry Summer). During this tour, she performed for the first time at Carnegie Hall in New York City. 

In 2000, Orbakaite won World Music Awards in Monte Carlo as the best-selling Russian singer. Later that year, she released her fourth album May. 

In 2002, she released her fifth album, Ver v chudesa (Believe in miracles) and appeared in the television series Moscow Saga. In 2003, she released her sixth album, Pereletnaya ptitsa (Wandering bird) and in 2005, she released her seventh album, My life.  On 17 January 2004, Kristina met her husband, American businessman Mikhail Zemtsov in Miami. They married in a private ceremony on 9 March 2005 in Miami Beach city hall.
 
In 2006, Orbakaite appeared in the comedy Lyubov-morkov (Love-carrot) together with Gosha Kutsenko. In 2013, received the title Merited Artist of the Russian Federation from Russian president Vladimir Putin.

In December 2016, her "Insomnia" world tour was presented with two shows in State Kremlin Palace. In 2017, the tour was presented in Russia, Israel, France, Kazakhstan, the United Kingdom, Germany and all Baltic states.

In 2022, she opposed the Russian invasion of Ukraine.

Personal life
She is currently married to Russian-American businessman Mikhail Zemtsov. They have a daughter, born on 30 March 2012. Orbakaite also has two sons from previous marriages to singer Vladimir Presniakov Jr. and businessman Rouslan Baïssarov, born in 1991 and 1998. She currently resides in US.

Discography
 1994 – Верность "Fidelity"
 1996 – Ноль Часов, Ноль Минут "Zero Hours, Zero Minutes"
 1998 – Ты "You"
 1999 – Той Женщине, Которая... "To That Woman, Who.."
 2000 – Май "May"
 2001 – The Best
 2001 – Remixes
 2002 – Верь В Чудеса "Believe in Miracles"
 2002 – Океан Любви "Ocean of Love"
 2003 – Перелётная птица "Wandering Bird"
 2005 – My Life
 2008 – Слышишь.. это я "Listen...it's me"
 2009 – The Best Part 1 and Part 2
 2011 – Поцелуй на бис "Encore Kiss"
 2013 – Маски "Masks"
 2016 – Бессонница "Insomnia"
 2021 – Svoboda "Freedom"

Filmography
 1983 - Scarecrow (Lena Bessoltseva) 
 1991 - Viva Gardes-Marines! (Princess "Fiquet", future Empress Catherine the Great) 
 1992 - Gardes-Marines III (Princess "Fiquet", future Empress Catherine the Great) 
 1993 - Charity ball (Shirli) 
 1995 - Limit (Katya) 
 1997 - Dunno on the Moon (Zvyozdochka Voice) 
 1999 - Fara (Neznakomka (unknown woman))
 1999 - Dunno on the Moon 2 (Zvyozdochka Voice) 
 2003 - The Snow Queen (Gerda) 
 2004 - Moscow Saga (Vera Gorda) TV-series 
 2007 - Lyubov-Morkov (Marina Golubeva) "Любовь-морковь" is the Russian idiom which literally translates as "Love-carrot". The English phrase "Lovey-dovey" has a close meaning. 
 2008 - Lyubov-Morkov 2 (Marina Golubeva) 
 2010 - Lyubov-Morkov 3 (Marina Golubeva) 
 2014 - The mystery of the four princesses (Queen Gurunda)
 2018 - Cinderella (Socialite) 
 2022 - Midshipmen 1787. World (Catherine the Great) 
 2022 - Pregnancy test 3 
 2022 - Lyubov-Morkov 4 (Marina Golubeva)

Theater
 1995 – Ponedelnik posle chuda ("Igroki" theater) in the role Helen Keller
 1997—2000 – Barishnia-krestianka (Yermolova Theatre) in the role Elizaveta Berestova
 2001 – Dannaya (Théâtre de l'Estrade) in the role Frina
 2018 - current – Dvoe na kocheliah ("Sovremennik Theater") in the role Gitel Moska

References

External links

  
 Kristina Orbakaitė  at the Forbes
 

|-
! colspan="3" style="background: cyan;" | World Music Awards
|-

|-

1971 births
20th-century Russian women singers
20th-century Russian singers
21st-century Russian women singers
21st-century Russian singers
Living people
Actresses from Moscow
Singers from Moscow
Honored Artists of the Russian Federation
Russian activists against the 2022 Russian invasion of Ukraine
Russian child actresses
Russian child singers
Russian film actresses
Russian people of Lithuanian descent
Russian pop singers
Russian Roman Catholics
Russian stage actresses
Soviet child actresses
Soviet child singers
Winners of the Golden Gramophone Award